Ptychosyrinx is a genus of sea snails and marine gastropod mollusks in the family Turridae, the turrids.

This genus has become a synonym of Cryptogemma Dall, 1918

Species
Species within the genus Ptychosyrinx include:
 Ptychosyrinx bisinuata (Martens, 1901): synonym of Cryptogemma praesignis (E. A. Smith, 1895)
 Ptychosyrinx carynae (Haas, 1949): synonym of Cryptogemma phymatias (R. B. Watson, 1886)
 Ptychosyrinx chilensis Berry, 1968: synonym of Cryptogemma chilensis (Berry, 1968) (original combination)
 Ptychosyrinx lobata (G.B. Sowerby III, 1903): synonym of Cryptogemma praesignis (E. A. Smith, 1895)
 Ptychosyrinx nodulosus (Gmelin, 1791): synonym of Ptychobela nodulosa (Gmelin, 1791)

References

 Cernohorsky, Walter O. "Taxonomic notes on some deep-water Turridae (Mollusca: Gastropoda) from the Malagasy Republic." Records of the Auckland Institute and Museum (1987): 123–134.

External links

Turridae